Afroarctia histrionica is a moth of the family Erebidae. It was described by Hervé de Toulgoët in 1978. It is found in Rwanda.

References

Moths described in 1978
Erebid moths of Africa
Spilosomina